NGC 4892 is a spiral or lenticular galaxy with LINER activity located 275 million light-years away in the constellation Coma Berenices. It was discovered by the astronomer William Herschel on April 11, 1785, and is a member of the Coma Cluster.

See also 
 List of NGC objects (4001–5000)

References

External links
 

4892
8108
44697
Coma Berenices
Astronomical objects discovered in 1785
Lenticular galaxies
LINER galaxies
Spiral galaxies
Coma Cluster